Gerhard Strutz (2 April 1943 – 3 November 1998) was an Austrian speed skater. He competed in the men's 5000 metres event at the 1964 Winter Olympics.

References

1943 births
1998 deaths
Austrian male speed skaters
Olympic speed skaters of Austria
Speed skaters at the 1964 Winter Olympics
Place of birth missing